El Satario, also known as El Sartorio, is the name of one of the earliest surviving pornographic films. It was supposedly produced in Argentina in 1907, and includes possibly the first use of extreme close-ups of genitalia. Others date it to 1930s Cuba. It has been suggested that the film is intended as a parody of Vaslav Nijinsky's ballet Afternoon of a Faun.

Plot
While a group of young women are frolicking in the countryside, a satyr appears and forces one woman to receive and perform oral sex and then have sex with him. Then the other women come and put him to flight.

Release 
The Kinsey Institute dates the film between 1907 and 1912. Journalist Kurt Tucholsky described in a 1913 article his experience viewing several stag films in Berlin, one of which has a similar description to El Satario.

See also
 Le Coucher de la Mariée

References

External links

1907 films
1900s pornographic films
Argentine silent films
Argentine black-and-white films